Any Old Wind That Blows is the 44th overall album by American country singer Johnny Cash, released on Columbia Records in 1973 (see 1973 in music). The album spawned three hits, most notably "Oney," which hit #2 on the country singles chart. The title track and Pete Seeger's "If I Had a Hammer" (previously a hit for Peter, Paul, and Mary) also charted. "Country Trash" was re-recorded by Cash nearly three decades later, on American III: Solitary Man. The album itself reached #5 on the country charts.

Track listing

Personnel
 Johnny Cash – vocals, guitar
 Bob Wootton, Carl Perkins – electric guitar
 Marshall Grant – bass guitar
 WS Holland – drums
 Red Lane, Larry Gatlin, Norman Blake, Ray Edenton – guitar
 Bobby Thompson – guitar, banjo
 Charles Cochrane, George Richey – piano
 Larry Butler – keyboards
 Charlie McCoy – harmonica
 Kenny Malone – percussion
 The Carter Family, The Statler Brothers – background vocals

Additional Personnel 
 Charles Cochran – arrangements on "Any Old Wind That Blows", "Kentucky Straight" and "The Good Earth"
 Don Tweedy – arrangement on "The Loving Gift"
 Charlie Bragg, Roger Tucker, Selby Coffeen, Freeman Ramsey, Jerry Watson – engineering
 Bill Barnes – cover design
 Al Clayton – photography

References

External links
 Luma Electronic entry on Any Old Wind That Blows

Any Old Wind That Blows
Any Old Wind That Blows
Albums produced by Larry Butler (producer)
Any Old Wind That Blows